Honey garlic sauce is a sweet and sour sauce that tastes like a mix between honey and garlic, popular in Canada. Honey garlic is one of the many sauces put on chicken wings, ribs, and other foods such as meatballs.

See also 
 Garlic sauce
 Agliata – a garlic sauce in Italian cuisine
 Buffalo wings
 Canadian cuisine
 List of garlic dishes
 List of sauces
 Teriyaki – similar to the sauce in Japanese cuisine, also seen in Canada

References 

Sauces
Canadian cuisine
Garlic dishes